Edwin Wallock (November 6, 1877 – February 4, 1951) was an American actor of the silent film era. He appeared in 60 films between 1912 and 1923. He was born in Council Bluffs, Iowa and died in Los Angeles, California.

Selected filmography
 Behind the Lines (1916)
 The Conspiracy (1916)
 Guilty (1916)
 The Cold Deck (1917)
 The Price Mark (1917)
 Even As You and I (1917)
 Square Deal Sanderson (1919)
 Duds (1920)
 The Sagebrusher (1920)
 The Green Flame (1920)
 Kazan (1921)
 I Can Explain (1922)
 The Hunchback of Notre Dame (1923)
 Eyes of the Forest (1923)

External links

1877 births
1951 deaths
Male actors from Iowa
American male film actors
American male silent film actors
20th-century American male actors